{
  "type": "FeatureCollection",
  "features": [
    {
      "type": "Feature",
      "properties": {},
      "geometry": {
        "type": "Point",
        "coordinates": [
          18.556938255205754,
          47.372314606375724
        ]
      }
    }
  ]
}Dunazug Mountains (Hu: Dunazug hegyvidék) is a part of Transdanubian Mountains in Hungary. It is the easternmost part of the mountains that connects it to the Danube Bend and the capital. The name itself also comes from the river (in Hungarian Duna), while zug means recess, corner.  

The highest peak is Pilis-tető, about 750 metres,   

The mountains are made up of sedimentary rock, mainly limestone.

Parts of the mountains 

 Gerecse Mountains
Pilis Mountains
 Buda Hills

Gallery

Sources 
(In Hungarian)

https://vandorbot.hu/dunazug-hegyvidek
https://www.arcanum.hu/hu/
http://www.karpat-medence.hu 

Mountains of Hungary